The VIII Conference of Heads of State and Government of the CPLP, commonly known as the 8th CPLP Summit (V Cimeira da CPLP) was the 8th biennial meeting of heads of state and heads of government of the Community of Portuguese Language Countries, held in Luanda, Angola, on 23 July 2010.

Outcome
The theme of the 8th CPLP Summit was "Solidarity in Diversity in the Space of the CPLP", centered on the importance of defense cooperation and the promotion of the Portuguese language.

Executive Secretary
Domingos Simões Pereira, former Prime Minister of Guinea-Bissau, was elected as the Executive Secretary of the Community of Portuguese Language Countries, succeeding Cabo Verdian diplomat Luís de Matos Monteiro da Fonseca in the position.

References

External links
CPLP Summits official site

CPLP Summits
Luanda
Foreign relations of Angola